The volcanic cone of Eldborg í Bláfjöllum is to be found at about 2 km from the skiing area in Bláfjöll, i.e. at about 25 km from Reykjavík, in Iceland.

Scoria cones
Eldborg í Bláfjöllum is a scoria cone, part of a group of three such small volcanoes. The crater group as well as the impressive lava channels and tubes nearby are products of eruptions within the Brennisteinsfjöll volcanic system around the year 1000.

Accessibility
Route 407 to the skiing area in Bláfjöll passes by the crater.

Some marked hiking trails connect the cone group of Eldborgir with the bigger mountains in the vicinity and other trails, e.g. the Reykjavegur Hiking Trail.

In the wintertime, cross country skiing is possible on cross-country ski-tracks in the area.

Natural monument
Eldborg and its surroundings are protected as a natural monument inside the Bláfjalla Fólkvangur. since 1971.

The area of the Natural Monument is defined as: from the Road Bláfjallavegur, 200 m from the foot of the crater group to the southern foot of the mountain Drottning, over the ridge of this mountain to its northern tip and from there back to the road.
 This means that it is not allowed to walk around the area outside of the marked hiking trails neither to drive around in it or ride a horse within the area. Any  construction work within the area needs permission.

Stóra-Kóngsfell and Drottning

Subglacial mounds
Not far from the scoria cone group, two subglacial mounds are to be found, Stóra-Kóngsfell  (602 m) and Drottning  (410 m). They had their origin in eruptions under thick glaciers during the last glaciations.

Names
The names of these two mountains mean "Big King's-Mountain" (Stóra-Kóngsfell) and "Queen" (Drottning). They are explained by Þór Vigfússon: The area was once a highland area connected to some farmland down in the valley, in Seltjarnarhreppur and Álftaneshreppur, which was in the possession of the Danish king. For this reason, the bigger mountain was named Stóra-Kóngsfell. The smaller mountain in the vicinity was first called "Litla-Kóngsfell" ( "Small King's-Mountain") by the farmers driving home their sheep in autumn, but the skiers of Bláfjöll called it "Drottning" (Queen),  and this is now its official name.

Hiking
For hikers, who would like to go up on Stóra-Kóngsfell, it is best accessible from the south.

See also
 Bláfjöll
 Stóra-Eldborg

External links
The Environment Agency of Iceland (in Icelandic)
  Skídasvaedi.is with map.

References

Volcanoes of Iceland
Reykjanes Volcanic Belt
Reykjanes
Brennisteinsfjöll Volcanic System